The Symphony No. 29 in A major, K. 201/186a, was completed by Wolfgang Amadeus Mozart on 6 April 1774. It is, along with Symphony No. 25, one of his better known early symphonies. Stanley Sadie characterizes it as "a landmark ... personal in tone, indeed perhaps more individual in its combination of an intimate, chamber music style with a still fiery and impulsive manner."

Structure 

Incipit of I. Allegro moderato
The symphony is scored for 2 oboes, 2 horns and strings, as was typical of early-period Mozart symphonies.

There are four movements:

The first movement is in sonata form, with a graceful principal theme characterized by an octave drop and ambitious horn passages. The second movement is scored for muted strings with limited use of the winds, and is also in sonata form. The third movement, a minuet, is characterized by nervous dotted rhythms and staccato phrases; the trio provides a more graceful contrast. The energetic last movement, another sonata-form movement in  time, connects back to the first movement with its octave drop in the main theme.

References

External links
 
BBC Discovering Music, and audio of that program (1 hour)
 

29
1774 compositions
Compositions in A major